Palcza  is a village in the administrative district of Gmina Budzów, within Sucha County, Lesser Poland Voivodeship, in southern Poland.

The village has a population of 1,100.

It was established probably before 1369 and was first mentioned in 1373 as a parish. It belonged to starostwo of Lanckorona ever since.

References

Palcza